93P/Lovas, also called Comet Lovas or Lovas's Comet, is a Jupiter-family comet discovered in 1980.

References

External links
 93P/Lovas at the JPL Small-Body Database Browser

Periodic comets
0093
Comets in 2017
19801205